Nattaphon Krobyoo (born September 27, 1989) is a professional footballer from Sisaket, Thailand. He currently plays for Ranong United in the Thai League 2.

External links

1989 births
Living people
Nattaphon Krobyoo
Association football goalkeepers
Nattaphon Krobyoo
Nattaphon Krobyoo
Nattaphon Krobyoo
Nattaphon Krobyoo